The Welsh Premier League is the top division of Welsh football. This is the list of the league's seasons.

History

Seasons

Notes 
Providing that the league champions have qualified for Europe by winning the league, these are the clubs who have qualified to play in Europe through the league only.
Includes only goals scored in the League of Wales/Welsh Premier League.
Caernarfon Town gained League of Wales membership prior to the 1994-95 season and subsequently left the Northern Premier League Division One.
Ton Pentre withdrew from the league at the end of the 1996–97 season after finding to continue was proving to be financially difficult.
Ebbw Vale were expelled from the league before the 1992–93 season began due to financial difficulties, and promptly went out of business.
Graham Evans was awarded the Golden Boot after Andy Moran was tested positive for a banned substance.
Rhyl were denied the domestic licence for competing in the 2010–11 Welsh Premier League and were therefore relegated to the second tier. Welsh Premier League aspirants Llangefni Town (Cymru Alliance) and Afan Lido (Welsh Football League Division One) were also denied licences meaning that no team from the second tier was promoted. Since these three teams failed to obtain licences, the best three teams originally to be relegated, with all three obtaining their licences, were spared from relegation (Bala Town, Haverfordwest County and Newtown AFC).
Clubs that have gained promotion from the Cymru Alliance.
Clubs that have gained promotion from the Welsh Football League Division One.

References

 
Premier